Mark II or Mark 2 often refers to the second version of a product, frequently military hardware. "Mark", meaning "model" or "variant", can be abbreviated "Mk."

Mark II or Mark 2 may refer to:

Military and weaponry
 16"/50 caliber Mark 2 gun, a U.S. Navy gun that was never mounted on any operational ship
 Vickers Medium Mark II, an interwar British tank
 Cruiser Mk II, a World War II British tank
 Mk 2 grenade, an American grenade used in World War II, Korean War and the Vietnam War
 Gerber Mark II (1967), an American double-edged combat knife
 Ruger MK II (1982–2005), an American semi-automatic pistol
 Ruger M77 Mark II, an American bolt-action rifle
 Thin Man nuclear bomb or Mark 2 nuclear bomb (1945), a gun-type plutonium bomb
 Mark II, a variant of the British Mark I tank
 Merkava Mark II, a variant of the Israeli Merkava battle tank
 Supermarine Spitfire Mk II, a Spitfire variant with a stronger Merlin engine

Vehicles
 British Rail Mark 2 (1964), a rail carriage design
 Jaguar Mark 2, an automobile produced from 1959 to 1967
 Continental Mark II (1956–1957), an American personal luxury car
 Ford Zephyr Mark II, an automobile produced in Australia and New Zealand
 Toyota Mark II, a series of Japanese car models
 Volkswagen Polo Mk2, an automobile produced between 1981 and 1994
 Bombardier ART Mark II, rolling stock used by Vancouver SkyTrain rapid transit

Other technologies
 Mark II (radio telescope), a radio telescope in England, constructed in 1964
 Harvard Mark II (1947), a computer built at Harvard University and used by the US Navy
 RCA Mark II Sound Synthesizer (1957), a musical instrument made of electronic components
 Canon EOS-1D Mark II, a digital SLR camera
 Canon EOS-1Ds Mark II, a digital SLR camera
 Canon EOS-5D Mark II, a digital SLR camera
 Dräger Oxy 3000/6000 MK II, Self Contained Self Rescuer (Mining)
 Mesa Boogie Mark II, a Mesa Boogie Mark Series electric guitar amplifier model
 Technics SL-1200, a direct-drive turntable very popular with DJ's
 Mariner Mark II, a proposed unmanned spacecraft program
 SG-1000 II, also known as the Mark II, a redesigned version of the SG-1000 sold by Sega in 1984.

Other uses
 Mark 2 or Mark II, the second chapter of the Gospel of Mark in the New Testament of the Christian Bible
 Mark II of Alexandria, Patriarch of Alexandria in 141–152
 Pope Mark II of Alexandria, patriarch of the Coptic Church from 799 to 819
 Mark II of Constantinople, Ecumenical Patriarch in 1465–1466
 Mk II (album) a 1969 album by Steamhammer
 MK II (Masterplan album) (2007)
 MKII or Mortal Kombat II, a video game
 Gundam Mk-II, a robot of the fictional Gundam series
 Mark II (robot), a giant robot built by MegaBots Inc.
 Mark II (film), a 1986 New Zealand film
 Mark II line-up of rock band Deep Purple, the most celebrated line-up in the band's life span, with Ian Gillan, Ritchie Blackmore, Jon Lord, Roger Glover and Ian Paice
 The Guide Mark II from Mostly Harmless
 S/2015 (136472) 1, a moon of Makemake, nicknamed MK 2 by the discovery team.